Daniel Nestor and Nenad Zimonjić were the defending champions but Zimonjić decided not to participate.
Nestor plays alongside Max Mirnyi.

World No.1s Bob Bryan and Mike Bryan defeated Max Mirnyi and Daniel Nestor in the final, 7–6(12–10), 6–3.

Seeds

Draw

Draw

External links
 Main draw

Doubles